Jihad of Construction or Construction Jihad ( Jahād-e Sāzandegī), or simply Jihad ( Jahād) was one of Organizations of the Iranian Revolution. The organization began as a movement of volunteers to help with the 1979 harvest, but soon was institutionalized and took on a broader, more developmental role in the countryside. It was involved with road building, piped water, electrification, clinics, schools, and irrigation canals. It also provides "extension services, seeds, loans," etc. to small farmers.

During the Iran–Iraq War, the organization held a combat engineering responsibility. They were active in various operation of the war, most notably in Operation Fath ol-Mobin, Operation Beit-ol-Moqaddas, Operation Kheibar, and Operation Dawn 8.

Iranian leader Ayatollah Khomeini has called them the "trench-less trench-makers" ( sangar-sāzān-e bi-sangar).

The organization engaged in development activities overseas in Tanzania (from 1987), Ghana and Lebanon (1989), Sudan and Sierra Leone (1991), and Albania (1993). It was also active in Pakistan, Afghanistan, and Bosnia and Herzegovina.

The title for a Jihad member is Jahādgar. The title for the commanders is Sardār-e Jahādgar.

In 2001 it was merged with the Agriculture Ministry to form the Ministry of Agriculture Jihad.

References

Further reading 

Organizations established in 1979
1979 establishments in Iran
Organizations disestablished in 2001
Organisations of the Iranian Revolution
Military engineering of Iran
Revolutionary institutions of the Islamic Republic of Iran
Military units and formations established in 1979
2001 disestablishments in Iran